Pöls-Oberkurzheim is a municipality since 2015 in the Murtal District of Styria, Austria.

The municipality, Pöls-Oberkurzheim, was created as part of the Styria municipal structural reform,
at the end of 2014, by merging the former market town Pöls with the municipality Oberkurzheim.

Geography

Municipality arrangement 
The municipality territory includes the following 21 sections (populations as of 1 January 2015):

 Allerheiligen (24)
 Allerheiligengraben (12)
 Enzersdorf (127)
 Götzendorf (97)
 Greith (104)
 Gusterheim (195)
 Katzling (138)
 Mauterndorf (178)
 Mosing (22)
 Mühltal (11)
 Oberkurzheim (133)
 Offenburg (29)
 Paig (64)
 Paßhammer (15)
 Pöls (1538)
 Pölshof (23)
 Sauerbrunn (25)
 Thalheim (158)
 Thaling (83)
 Unterzeiring (15)
 Winden (56)

The municipality consists of the six Katastralgemeinden Allerheiligen, Enzersdorf, Oberkurzheim, Pöls, Thalheim and Unterzeiring.

Tourismus 
The municipality formed, together with Pusterwald and Pölstal, the tourism agency "Region Pölstal". The base is in the town Pölstal.

Culture and sights 
 Pfarrkirche Allerheiligen in Pöls

References 

Cities and towns in Murtal District